MEDHOST is a Health Information Technology company, founded in 1984, which is based in Franklin, Tennessee, United States with a secondary office in Plano, Texas.

Company history
On February 1, 2010, HealthTech Holdings, the parent company of Healthcare Management Systems, Inc., acquired MEDHOST, Inc. which at the time developed emergency department systems. MEDHOST's software was integrated into HMS' hospital information system.

In 2011, MEDHOST received ONC 2011 Edition certification for and launched Meaningful Use Stage 1 software package.

On December 16, 2013, HealthTech Holdings announced it had combined certain of its subsidiaries and software, rebranding itself as MEDHOST and offering its products under the MEDHOST brand.

In 2014, MEDHOST was named one of Nashville Business Journal's top 25 fastest-growing private companies.

In 2017, MEDHOST became one of the first EHR vendors to achieve ONC 2015 Edition certification required by CMS MU Stage III.

In 2019, MEDHOST launched MEDHOST Business Services.

In 2020, MEDHOST launched Price Transparency product for hospitals.

Leadership 
Bill Anderson – Chairman and CEO

Ken Misch – President

Matthew Higgins - Chief Financial Officer

Kenneth Barfield – Executive Vice President, General Counsel

References and External Links

Health information technology companies